Haslah Haji Hassan is a Malaysian lawn bowls international and national coach.

Bowls career

Bowling
Hassan won a bronze medal in the Women's fours at the Commonwealth Games in Kuala Lumpur with Siti Zalina Ahmad, Nor Azwa Mohamed Di and Nor Hashimah Ismail. 

She has won five medals at the Asia Pacific Bowls Championships including a gold medal in the 2003 triples, in Brisbane, Australia and also won a three gold medals in the Lawn bowls at the Southeast Asian Games (twice in the fours and once in the pairs).

Coaching
She has coached the elite women's Malaysian national team from 2009.

References

Living people
1965 births
Bowls players at the 1998 Commonwealth Games
Commonwealth Games bronze medallists for Malaysia
Malaysian female bowls players
Commonwealth Games medallists in lawn bowls
Southeast Asian Games gold medalists for Malaysia
Southeast Asian Games medalists in lawn bowls
Competitors at the 1999 Southeast Asian Games
Competitors at the 2001 Southeast Asian Games
Competitors at the 2005 Southeast Asian Games
Medallists at the 1998 Commonwealth Games